The following is a list of Holy Cross Crusaders men's basketball head coaches. There have been 18 head coaches of the Crusaders in their 104-season history.

Holy Cross' most recent head coach was Brett Nelson. He was fired after the 2022–23 season.

References

Holy Cross

Holy Cross basketball, men's, coaches